Nirakudam is a 1977 Indian Malayalam-language film, directed by A. Bhimsingh and produced by Baby. The film stars Kamal Haasan, Sudheer, Sridevi, Sukumari, Kaviyoor Ponnamma and Adoor Bhasi. It is a remake of the director's own Tamil film Bhaaga Pirivinai (1959). The film was released on 29 July 1977 and emerged a commercial success.

Plot 
Dharmapalan and his younger brother Satyapalan live together along with their family. Dharmapalan does not have any children, while Satyapalan has two sons. His older son Devan's left leg and hand were paralysed due to an electric shock while he was still a child, while his younger son Rajan is studying in college in the city.

Dharmapalan's wife Bhargavi is jealous of Satyapalan's family and invites her brother's children Prabhakaran and Usha to live with them. Prabhakaran plans and organises Usha's marriage with Rajan. He also creates a rift between the brother's families, ensuring that the families separate. Satyapalan and his wife Sati find it difficult to find a bride for Devan. Santha an orphan maid, volunteers to marry Devan. Eventually Devan and Rajan are blessed with children.

Prabhakaran borrows money from Bhargavi and Rajan to invest in a dance show business in the city with Margarette and her daughter Anarkali. Prabhakaran loses heavily in the dance shows. Rajan had taken money from his office and is under pressure to return the money. In the meanwhile Santha decides to get Devan treated for his handicap and they come to the city.

Bhargavi and Rajan demand that Prabhakaran returns their money. Prabhakaran desperate to make money, snatches Devan's child and tries to organise a circus show involving an elephant and Devan's child. Both Devan and Santha reach the venue. Devan, desperate to save his child from the elephant, comes in contact with a live wire and gets an electric shock.
As a result of the shock he recovers and saves his child. Prabhakaran is arrested. The separated families of Dharmapalan and Satyapalan are united and they live together happily.

Cast 

Kamal Haasan as Devan
Sridevi as Santha
Sudheer as Rajan
Adoor Bhasi as Dharmapalan
Sukumari as Bhargavi
Nellikode Bhaskaran as Satyapalan
Kaviyoor Ponnamma as Sathi
Jose Prakash as Prabhakaran
Reena as Usha
Pattom Sadan as Raghavan
Philomina as Naaniyamma
Khadeeja as Margarette
Usharani as Anarkali
Pala Thankam as Aaya
Santo Krishnan as Gunda
K. J. Yesudas as himself

Production 
The film was a remake of director A. Bhimsingh's own Tamil film Bhaaga Pirivinai (1959). The film was produced by Baby under the banner of Swapna Films. G. Vittal Rao was the cinematographer and K. Sankunni edited the film. Playwright and actor Surasu wrote script and dialogues for the story written by M. S. Cholamalai. The film was shot at AVM Studio in Madras (now Chennai).

Soundtrack 
The music was composed by Jaya–Vijaya and the lyrics were written by Bichu Thirumala. The song "Nakshathradeepangal Thilangi" from this film features K. J. Yesudas singing on stage.

Release 
Nirakudam was released on 29 July 1977. The film was a commercial success, running for over 100 days in theatres.

References

External links 
 

1970s Malayalam-language films
1977 films
Films directed by A. Bhimsingh
Indian black-and-white films
Malayalam remakes of Tamil films